Calopiidae is a family of sea snails, marine gastropod molluscs in the superfamily Truncatelloidea.

References 

 The Taxonomicon

 
Taxa named by Winston Ponder